Željko Markov (born 20 September 1976) is a Serbian professional football manager, who is currently in charge of Kazma SC.

Markov was born in Pančevo, Serbia.

Style of coaching
Markov favours a very high-pressing, attacking style of football. He often employs a  4–3–3 formation and  3–4–3 formation at the clubs he manages.

Honours and awards
Football Club Al-Mesaimeer Sports Club
Qatargas League: 3rd place 2017
Football Club Sohar SC
Sultan Qaboos Cup: 1/2 final 2011

External links

spijkenissea-selectie2011.ditismijnteam.nl

1976 births
Living people
Sportspeople from Pančevo
Serbian footballers
Serbian football managers
Expatriate football managers in Bahrain
Oman Professional League managers
FK Dinamo Pančevo players
Association footballers not categorized by position
A.C. Monza players
VV Spijkenisse managers
Kuwait Premier League managers
Serbian expatriate sportspeople in Kuwait
Al Tadhamon SC managers
Expatriate football managers in Kuwait
Kazma SC managers
Expatriate football managers in Oman
Serbian expatriate sportspeople in Oman
Serbian expatriate sportspeople in Bahrain
Serbian expatriate sportspeople in Qatar
Expatriate football managers in Qatar
Serbian expatriate sportspeople in the Netherlands
Expatriate football managers in the Netherlands
Mesaimeer SC managers
Al-Ittihad Club (Salalah) managers
Serbian expatriate football managers
Sohar SC managers
FK Spartak Subotica managers
Serbia and Montenegro expatriate footballers
Manama Club players
Serbia and Montenegro expatriate sportspeople in Bosnia and Herzegovina
Expatriate footballers in Bosnia and Herzegovina
FK Radnik Bijeljina players
FK Palilulac Beograd players
Expatriate footballers in Greece
Serbia and Montenegro expatriate sportspeople in Greece
FK Hajduk Kula players
Serbia and Montenegro expatriate sportspeople in Bahrain
Expatriate footballers in Bahrain